The 2021 edition of the Canadian Polaris Music Prize was presented on September 27, 2021. Due to the COVID-19 pandemic in Canada, the award was presented in a livestreamed virtual event hosted by Angeline Tetteh-Wayoe of CBC Music.

The longlist was announced on June 16, 2021, with the shortlist following on July 15, 2021.

Shortlist

Longlist

Polaris Heritage Prize
Nominees for the Slaight Family Polaris Heritage Prize, an award to honour classic Canadian albums released before the creation of the Polaris Prize, were announced after the main Polaris Prize ceremony. The winners were announced on October 26.

References 

2021 in Canadian music
2021 music awards
2021